Dewahuwa is a small village situated in the Matale District, Central Province, Sri Lanka.

See also
List of towns in Central Province, Sri Lanka

External links

Populated places in Matale District